Rubin Whitmore II is an American media maker who directs mostly music videos and short narratives.  Born and raised in Milwaukee, Wisconsin, he received his undergraduate degree in Radio/TV/Film from the University of Wisconsin-Oshkosh where he was selected Outstanding Young Alumni   and he is a MFA candidate in Digital Cinema at National University. While in his senior year at UW-Oshkosh he directed his first national music video for MC Breed's "Late Nite Creep".

He has directed and produced projects ranging from docudrama, 10 Rules for Dealing with Police to Internet webisode, "omg!". His stories often involve multi-cultural perspectives and casts. He has directed music videos for KRS-One, Gang Starr, DMX, The Temptations and many others. The music video featuring E-40, "Sprinkle Me", was produced and directed by Whitmore and is the "#10 Greatest West Coast Video" according to MTV2 and XXL.

He is also a media scholar and activist. Whitmore currently instructs at the Art Institute and has lectured at universities and colleges across the country regarding media's impact on society.  He has declared that "Media is a weapon, TV is a gun, the programming is the bullets." He has participated in political campaigns as a media consultant and encourages the use of new media as an effective tool for business and social entrepreneurship.

Whitmore is the director of the feature film 420.

Whitmore is a member of Alpha Phi Alpha fraternity.

Music Videography (Director or Producer) partial list
 3 Piece - Ohh Ahh
 Big Mike - Playa Playa
 C-Bo - Birds in the Kitchen
 Cha Cha - New Millennium
 Christion - Next 2 You
 Click - Hurricane
 Coko - Triflin'''
 Dayton Family - Goin Thru A Thang Digital Underground - Walk Real Kool DMX - Slippin E.S.G. - Swangin' & Bangin'''
 E-40 featuring Too $hort & K.C. - Rapper's Ball E-40 - Sprinkle Me Elusion - Reality eMC – The Show Gang Starr - Discipline Ghosttown DJs - My Boo Goodie Mob - Dirty South Goodie Mob - Soul Food Indigo Girls - Shame On You Inoj - Love You Down Jadakiss - Put Yo Hands Up Jadakiss, Snoop Dogg, Scarface & Young One - WWIII Joe  -The Love Scene Keith Murray - It's That Hit KRS-One - Step Into A World Kwamé - What's It Like Luniz - I Got Five On It (Remix) M.C. Breed - Late Nite Creep (Booty Call) Mack 10 - Hoo-Bangin
 Mad Skillz - The Nod Factor
 Means & Pamela - Up to Here
 Mystikal - Out That Bootcamp Clicc
 New Edition featuring Missy "Misdemeanor" Elliott - You Don't Have To Worry
 Nitti, Ray – Bow!
 Questionmark Asylum - Get With You
 Spice 1 - Nineteen Ninety Sick
 Temptations - I'm Here
 Too $hort - Cocktails
 Too $hort - Top Down
 Too $hort - Paystyles
 Tung Twista – Suicide
 Usher - Dreamin

DVDs & Films partial list
 Too Short: Cocktales
 20th Century Masters: The Best of The Temptations
 10 Rules for Deal with Police
 420

Webisodes
 omg!

References

External links
 Official Website
 
 Rubin Whitmore II mvdbase

American music video directors
African-American film directors
American film directors
Filmmakers from Milwaukee
Living people
Year of birth missing (living people)
21st-century African-American people